This is the order of battle for the Battle of San Juan and Chorrillos in 1881 during the War of the Pacific.

Chilean Operations Army 
Commander in Chief of the Chilean Army: GLD Manuel Baquedano González (37)
Total strength: 23,179 men
Chief of Staff: GLB Marcos Maturana (48)
General Inspector of the Army: GLB Cornelio Saavedra Rodríguez (6)
Commander of Artillery: Col. Jose Velasquez Borquez (6)
Commander of Cavalry: Lt. Col. Emeterio Letelier (6)
Sanitary Service Superintendent: Dr. Ramón Allende Padín (241)
1° Ambulance
2° Ambulance
3° Ambulance
Logistic and Transport Services: Col. Francisco Bascuñán (140)

I Division
Commodore Patricio Lynch Solo de Zaldívar, Chilean Navy (6)
Chief of Staff: Col. Gregorio Urrutia, Chilean Army (15)
Strength: 9.295 men
1st Infantry Brigade Col. Juan Martinez (3)
2nd Line Infantry Regiment (Lt. Col. Estanislao del Canto) (980)
Atacama Infantry Regiment  (Col. Juan Martinez) (1.174)
Colchagua Infantry Regiment (Lt. Col. Manuel Soffia) (854)
Talca Infantry Regiment (Lt. Col. Silvertre Urizar) (1.184)
Marine Artillery Regiment (Lt. Col. Vidaurre) (360)
Melipilla Infantry Battalion (Lt. Col. Vicente Balmaceda) (451)
2nd Infantry Brigade Col. Jose Domingo Amunategui
4th Line Infantry Regiment (Col. Luis Solo de Zaldivar)
"Chacabuco" Infantry Regiment (Col. Domingo de Toro Herrera)
Coquimbo Infantry Regiment (Lt. Col. Jose Maria 2º Soto)

II Division
Col. Emilio Sotomayor Baeza
Strength: 5,970 men
1st Brigade Col. Jose Francisco Gana
"Buin" 1st Line Infantry Regiment (Lt. Col. Juan Leon Garcia)
"Esmeralda" Infantry Regiment (Lt Col. Adolfo Holley)
Chillán Infantry Regiment (Lt. Col. Pedro Guiñez)
2nd Brigade Col. Orozimbo Barbosa
Lautaro Infantry Regiment (Lt. Col. Eulogio Robles)
Curicó Infantry Battalion
Victoria Infantry Battalion

III Division
Col. Pedro Lagos
Strength: 
1st Brigade Col. Martiniano Urriola
Aconcagua Infantry Regiment
Navales Infantry Battalion
2nd Brigade Col. Francisco Barceló
Concepción Infantry Regiment
"Santiago" Infantry Regiment (Col. Demófilo Fuenzalida)
Bulnes Infantry Battalion
Valdivia Infantry Battalion
Caupolican Infantry Battalion (Col. José M. del Canto)

Reserve
Col. Aristides Martínez
Strength: 
3rd Line Infantry Regiment (Col. Ricardo Castro)
Valparaíso Infantry Regiment (Lt. Col. Marchant)
Zapadores Infantry Regiment (Lt. Col. Zilleruelo)

Peruvian Army
Supreme Commander in Chief: President Nicolás de Piérola
Chief of the General Staff: Gen. Pedro Silva

North Army
Gen. Ramón Vargas Machuca

I Army Corps
Col. Manuel Iglesias
1st North Division Col. Mariano Noriega
1st Peruvian Guards Infantry Battalion
Cajamarca No.3 Infantry Battalion
Ayacucho "9th December" 5th Infantry Battalion
2nd North Division Col. Manuel Regino Cano
Tarma No.7 Infantry Battalion
9th Infantry Battalion Callao
Libres de Trujillo No.11 Infantry Battalion
3rd North Division Col. Pablo Arguedas
13th Infantry Battalion "Junin"
15th Infantry Battalion Ica
Libres de Cajamarca No.21 Infantry Battalion

II Army Corps
Col. Belisario Suarez
4th North Division Col. Buenaventura Aguirre
Huanuco No.17 Infantry Battalion
Paucarpata No.19 Infantry Battalion
Jauja No.23 Infantry Battalion
5th North Division Col. Benigno Cano
Ancash No.25 Infantry Battalion
Concepción No.27 Infantry Battalion
Zepita or Zuavos No.29 Infantry Battalion

Center Army
Col. Juan Nepomuceno Vargas

III Army Corps
Col. Justo Pastor Dávila
3rd Center Division Col. Cesar Canevaro
67th Infantry Battalion Piura
23 December No.69 Infantry Battalion
Libertad No.71 Infantry Battalion
5th Center Division Col. Fabian Merino
85th Cajamarca Ranger Battalion
Unión No.87 Infantry Battalion
89th Junín Rifle Infantry Battalion
Light Division Col. Manuel C. Bustamante, Peruvian Civil Guard
A and C Corps, Civil Guard
D and E Corps, Civil Guard
B Corps, Civil Guard

IV Army Corps
Col. Andrés Avelino Cáceres
1st Center Division Col. Domingo Oyarza
61st Lima Infantry Battalion
Canta No.63 Infantry Battalion
28 July No.65 Infantry Battalion
2nd Center Division Col. Manuel Pereyra
Pichincha No.73 Infantry Battalion
Piérola No.75 Infantry Battalion
La Mar No.77 Infantry Battalion
4th Center Division Col. Lorenzo Iglesias
Arica No.79 Infantry Battalion
Manco Cápac No.81 Infantry Battalion
83rd Ayachucho Infantry Battalion

References
 
 

War of the Pacific orders of battle